Heteranthera is a genus of aquatic plants in the water hyacinth family, Pontederiaceae, known generally as mud plantains. Species of this genus are native to tropical and subtropical America and Africa. They live in the water or in wet soils. They produce leaves on long petioles and some are cultivated for their attractive flowers. Leaves are of two types - linear and submerged or orbicular and floating. Some species have cleistogamic flowers.

Selected species
Heteranthera callifolia (syn. H. callaefolia)
Heteranthera dubia (Jacq.) MacMill. – Grassleaf mud plantain, water stargrass
Heteranthera limosa (Sw.) Willd. – Blue mud plantain, ducksalad
Heteranthera mexicana S.Watson – Mexican mud plantain
Heteranthera multiflora (Griseb.) Horn – Bouquet mud plantain
Heteranthera peduncularis Benth. – Egret mud plantain
Heteranthera reniformis Ruiz & Pav. – Kidneyleaf mud plantain
Heteranthera rotundifolia (Kunth) Griseb. – Roundleaf mud plantain
Heteranthera zosterifolia  – Stargrass

References

External links

Jepson Manual Treatment

Pontederiaceae
Commelinales genera